The Dr. John Grace House and Hospital is a historic house and hospital in rural Yell County, Arkansas.  Located on the north side of North Road, west of Belleville, it is a two-story L-shaped wood-frame structure.  It was built in 1912 for Dr. John Grace, a Yell County native who began practicing medicine in Belleville in 1906, and was until 1937 to sole source of healthcare in the Belleville vicinity.

The house was listed on the National Register of Historic Places in 2015.

See also
National Register of Historic Places listings in Yell County, Arkansas

References

Houses on the National Register of Historic Places in Arkansas
Hospital buildings on the National Register of Historic Places in Arkansas
National Register of Historic Places in Yell County, Arkansas
Houses completed in 1912
1912 establishments in Arkansas
Houses in Yell County, Arkansas